Merton Priory was an English Augustinian priory founded in 1114 by Gilbert Norman, Sheriff of Surrey under King Henry I (1100–1135). It was situated within the manor of Merton in the county of Surrey, in what is today the Colliers Wood area in the London Borough of Merton.

Buildings and holdings
The priory buildings were situated within the Diocese of Winchester (now in the Diocese of Southwark) and at the point where the River Wandle was crossed by Stane Street (the Roman road to Chichester), about  outside the City of London. It held cultivated land and pastures there and at other places in Surrey and held manors and other lands elsewhere in England including Teign (Canons' Teign) in Devon.

History
By 1117 the foundation had been colonised by Canons Regular from the Augustinian priory at Huntingdon and re-sited in Merton, close to the Wandle.

The priory became an important centre of learning and diplomacy.  Thomas Becket briefly studied there around 1130, and later was wont to wear the habit of a Merton canon – as was a successor of his, Hubert Walter.  It is thought that Walter de Merton studied there in the 1230s; he established a house for Merton scholars in Old Malden, and this eventually was moved to Oxford, becoming Merton College.  Edmund Rich wrote some of his Oxford lectures in the peace of the Priory.  In 1205, King John sent a canon of Merton as an ambassador to Normandy; Prince Louis of France did penance there after a series of peace conferences culminating in the Treaty of Lambeth in 1217.

In 1236 King Henry III held a Parliament at the Priory at which the Statute of Merton was passed allowing, amongst other matters, lords of the manor to enclose common land provided that sufficient pasture remained for their tenants. This was the first recorded statute of the first recorded English parliament.

On 1 November 1437, shortly before his 16th birthday, Henry VI had a crowning ceremony at Merton Priory, although the exact nature of this is unclear.

Destruction

The Priory was demolished in 1538, following King Henry VIII's Dissolution of the Monasteries, having been valued in the Valor Ecclesiasticus of 1535 at a relatively high sum of £960 16 shillings 6 pence. John Bowles alias John Ramsey surrendered the monastery of 14 canons on 16 April 1538.  Much of the masonry was reused at the king's Nonsuch Palace. The site of the Priory is now occupied by Sainsbury's supermarket (Merton branch). Remains of the Chapter House are now a museum under Merantun Way, between Sainsbury's and Merton Abbey Mills.

References

External links

The Heritage Trail
Merton Priory Trust
Excavation of Ruins
BBC video of the site
Merton Priory – History Unearthed

Religion in the London Borough of Merton
Monasteries in London
Monasteries in Surrey
1538 disestablishments in England
Religious organizations established in the 1110s
History of the London Borough of Merton
Christian monasteries established in the 12th century
1114 establishments in England
Monasteries dissolved under the English Reformation
Museums in the London Borough of Merton